This is a comprehensive listing of official releases by Vanessa da Mata, a Brazilian MPB singer-songwriter. Since 2002, she has released three studio albums on Sony Music Entertainment. According to the Associação Brasileira de Produtores de Disco (Brazilian Association of Record Producers), da Mata has sold over 1,700,000 albums in her home country.

Albums
Studio albums

Live albums

Tribute albums

Video Albums

EPs
2007: CD Zero (Sim EP)

Singles

Soundtrack appearances

Songs recorded by other artists
"A Força que Nunca Seca" - Maria Bethânia (A Força que Nunca Seca, 1999)
"Viagem" - Daniela Mercury (Sol da Liberdade, 2000)
"Me Sento na Rua" - Ana Carolina (Ana Rita Joana Iracema e Carolina, 2001)
"O Canto de Dona Sinhá" - Maria Bethânia (Maricotinha, 2001 e Maricotinha Ao Vivo, 2002)

References

Discographies of Brazilian artists
Pop music discographies
Latin music discographies